The teardrop white-eye (Rukia ruki), also known as the Faichuk white-eye, Truk white-eye, or great Truk white-eye, is a species of bird in the family Zosteropidae. Some advocate that it is the only true member of the genus Rukia, or the "great white-eyes".

Distribution and habitat
It is endemic to the summit of Mount Winipot on Tol, in the Faichuk group of islands within the Chuuk (Truk) atoll in Micronesia. Its habitat is montane rainforest dominated by the endemic Chuuk poisontree. Due to its restricted range on one small mountaintop and the locals' disdain for the native poisontree, it is severely threatened by habitat loss.

References

External links
BirdLife Species Factsheet

teardrop white-eye
Birds of the Federated States of Micronesia
teardrop white-eye
Taxonomy articles created by Polbot